Petalura ingentissima, the giant petaltail, has been described as the world's largest dragonfly, with a wingspan of 160 mm. It is found in Queensland, Australia.

Dr R.J. Tillyard described the giant petaltail in 1908. Its species name is derived from the Latin adjective ingens "huge". It is one of five species in the Australian genus Petalura.

A large heavily built dragonfly, the giant petaltail has a black body with some yellow markings. The female's wingspan can be 158–162 mm and body length 125 mm, the largest dragonfly species in overall dimensions although members of the genus Tetracanthagyna can have longer wings and Chlorogomphus papilio a larger wing area.

Measuring 5.9-6.3 cm long, the larvae are unusual in that they live in burrows along the river margin and hunt passing prey.

Gallery

See also
 List of Odonata species of Australia

References

Petaluridae
Odonata of Australia
Insects of Australia
Endemic fauna of Australia
Taxa named by Robert John Tillyard
Insects described in 1908